The iPhone SE is a series of lower-cost smartphones, part of the iPhone family designed by Apple. It may refer to:

 iPhone SE (1st generation), released in 2016
 iPhone SE (2nd generation), released in 2020
 iPhone SE (3rd generation), released in 2022